Edward Solly (1786–1844) was an English merchant and art collector.

Edward Solly may also refer to:

Edward Solly (chemist) (1819–1886), English chemist and antiquary, son of the art collector
Edward Walter Solly (1882–1966), English cricketer
Elmer Edward Solly (1945–2007), American convicted killer